The National Intelligence Agency (NIA) is a Nigerian government division tasked with overseeing foreign intelligence and counterintelligence operations.

History
Fulfilling one of the promises made in his first national address as president, in June 1986 Ibrahim Babangida issued Decree Number 19, dissolving the National Security Organization (NSO) and restructuring Nigeria's security services into three separate entities under the Office of the Co-ordinator of National Security.
 State Security Service (SSS) – Responsible for domestic intelligence
 National Intelligence Agency (NIA) – Responsible for foreign intelligence and counterintelligence operations
 Defence Intelligence Agency (DIA) – Responsible for military intelligence.

Directors General of the NIA

References

 Nigeria: NIA: 20 Years of Service
 Nigeria: The National Intelligence Agency (NIA) At Twenty - A Tribute

Valentine Tobechukwu Achum  http://sunnewsonline.com/nia-ecowas-and-nigerias-national-interest/

Government of Nigeria
Nigerian intelligence agencies
Government agencies established in 1986
1986 establishments in Nigeria